The Wedding Unplanner is a 2020 Spanish comedy film directed by Dani de la Orden consisting of a remake of the 2017 French film . It stars Belén Cuesta, Álex García and Silvia Alonso alongside Adrián Lastra, Antonio Dechent, Gracia Olayo, Mariam Hernández, Salva Reina and Leo Harlem.

Plot 
Marina (a wedding planner free from commitments) has a one-night stand with Carlos (in a relationship with Alexia). Upon finding a business card belonging to Marina among Carlos' stuff, Alexia interprets it as a marriage proposal, and so the couple eventually hires Marina (who turns out to be an Alexia's childhood acquaintance) as a planner for their wedding.

Cast

Production 
An adaptation of the 2017 French film Jour J, the screenplay was penned by Olatz Arroyo, Marta Sánchez and Eric Navarro. An Atresmedia Cine and Álamo Producciones Audiovisuales production, the film had the participation of Movistar+ and Orange. It was shot in between Tenerife and Madrid. Eduardo Campoy, Mercedes Gamero, and Mikel Lejarza took over production duties.

Release 
The film was pre-screened on 6 February 2020 in Paterna. Distributed by A Contracorriente Films, it was theatrically released in Spain on 14 February 2020. The film had some time for its theatrical window before the COVID-19 pandemic disruption gave way to a complete closure of Spanish theatres on 13 March 2020, becoming the fourth highest-grossing Spanish film in 2020, with circa €2.7 million (over 452,000 admissions).

Reception 
Javier Ocaña of El País wrote that the film, which he considered to be superior to the French original, is "in principle, a good comedy", but that by and large it had already been made "very recently" and next door, considering that the remake trend "may make all the commercial sense in the world. But from an artistic standpoint it is disappointing".

Manu Piñón of Fotogramas rated the film 3 out of 5 stars, highlighting Cuesta and García's comedy performances as the best thing about the film.

Beatriz Martínez of El Periódico de Catalunya rated the film 2 out of 5 stars, deeming it to "a correct film, but one that we have seen a thousand times. Functional, but aseptic".

Wondering if it had already come the time to praise the much vilified trend of film remakes, Rubén Romero Santos of Cinemanía rated the film 3 out of 5 stars, assessing that the wedding reception "is basically the same" (as in the French film) but "leaves a better taste in the mouth".

See also 
 List of Spanish films of 2020

References 

Spanish remakes of French films
2020 romantic comedy films
Films shot in the Canary Islands
Films shot in Madrid
Spanish romantic comedy films
2020s Spanish-language films
Atresmedia Cine films
Films about weddings
2020s Spanish films